Gemmula pseudostupa is a species of sea snail, a marine gastropod mollusk in the family Turridae, the turrids.

Description

Distribution
This marine species occurs in the South China Sea.

References

 Cheng Y.-P. [Yu-Pin] & Lee C.-Y. [Chih-Yeh] (2011) One new bathyal turrids (Gastropoda: Turridae) from South China Sea. Bulletin of Malacology, Taiwan 35: 25–32.

pseudostupa
Gastropods described in 1967